The Djurab Desert (Djourab) is a desert in northern Chad. Part of the greater Sahara desert, it makes up much of the area of Chad's Borkou region.

The Koro Toro settlement and maximum security prison is situated on the eastern boundary of the desert. 
The closest major settlements are Salal to the south and Faya-Largeau to the northeast. To the west is the Ténéré desert (the Erg of Bilma) of western Chad and Niger, to the north are the Tibesti Mountains of the central Sahara.

Aeolian deflation in the northern subbasin formed the desert with an arid conditions. Desert reached through Sahara and reduced Lake Chad.

Many fossils have been found in this desert, Kossom Bougoudi and Toros-Menalla being among the most bountiful fossil-bearing areas.
A team led by Michel Brunet, from the University of Poitiers, excavated in the Djurab desert during the  mid-1990s.

Michel Brunet, since 1994, has explored Miocene and Pliocene deposits in the desert with the Mission Paléoanthropologique Franco-Tchadienne, which are located in a basin which includes Lake Chad.
In the period of the Sahelanthropus tchadensis, desert would have long dry season, and fruits would have been able to grow at certain times of the year.

Patrick Vignaud applied plaster to a crocodile cranium in this desert.

References

Bibliography 

 
 

Deserts of Africa
Geography of Chad